Michael Alfreds (born 5 June 1934) is an English theatre director,  adapter, translator and teacher. He has worked all over the world and won awards for his productions.

Biography

Michael Alfreds was born in London in 1934. He spent his National Service in the Royal Air Force in Singapore from 1952 to 1954.

From 1954 to 1962 he lived in the United States. He worked in the Publicity Department of MGM Studios from 1955 to 1957 and directed for small theatres around Los Angeles. He trained as a director, first at the American Theatre Wing in New York, then from 1957 to 1960 in the Theatre Department of Carnegie Mellon. During those years, he directed seasons of musicals and operas in summer stock in Kennebunkport. After graduating, he directed for Theatre West, Tucson and from 1961 to 1962, he was artistic director of the Cincinnati Playhouse-in-the-Park to 19.

Back in the UK, he taught at the London Academy of Music and Dramatic Art (LAMDA) in London from 1965 to 1970.  From 1970 to 1975, he worked in Israel. He was senior lecturer at the theatre department of Tel Aviv University and, from 1972 to 1975, he was artistic director of the Khan Theatre in  Jerusalem and contributed immensely to its development. He also directed plays for the Cameri Theatre in Tel Aviv, Bimot Theatre, the Haifa Municipal Theatre and Beersheva Theatre.

Alfreds returned to the UK in 1975 where he founded and was artistic director of Shared Experience until 1985. He directed for the Royal National Theatre between 1985 and 1988. From 1991 to 1999, he was director of the Cambridge Theatre Company renamed Method and Madness. In 2001 and 2002, he directed for Shakespeare's Globe and in 1994, for the Royal Shakespeare Company. As well as the USA and Israel, he has worked abroad in Canada, Australia, New Zealand, Germany, Norway, France, Italy, Mongolia and China. He has translated the texts of several of his productions and has also specialised in the adaptation of novels and stories for the stage and has developed techniques for storytelling in the theatre.

Alfreds has written two books on his working methods: Different Every Night, which deals with his rehearsal processes for plays, and Then What Happens, concerning his methods of working on adaptations. He has divided his career between directing and teaching acting and directing. Alfreds is  known for his special method of working with actors, inspired amongst others by the principles of Constantin Stanislavski and Rudolf Laban, with emphasis on physical work, scrupulous analysis of text, spontaneity and interaction with others during the play in minimalistic productions.

Directed in Britain (selection) 
 2018:   Year of Wonders adapted by Jane Arnfield, Mike Alfreds, [The Lowry], Salford, Lit and Phil, Alphabetti Theatre Newcastle, Gala Theatre Durham
 2011: The Tin Ring by Zdenka Fantlová, adapted by Jane Arnfield, Mike Alfreds, [The Lowry], Salford
 2001: Cymbeline by William Shakespeare, The Globe 
 1998: The Black Dahlia by James Ellroy, National Theatre
 1985: The Cherry Orchard by Anton Tchekhov, National Theatre (won him a Critics' Circle Theatre Award)
 1982: A Handful of Dust by Evelyn Waugh, Shared Experience
 1996: Jude the Obscure, by Thomas Hardy, Taunton
 1987: The Wandering Jew by Micheline Wandor and Mike Alfreds, after Eugene Sue, National Theatre
 1984: Marriage by Nikolai Gogol, Shared Experience

Directed in Israel (selection) 
 La Mandragola (The Mandrake) by Niccolò Machiavelli. 
 The Persian Protocols
 The House of Bernarda Alba (Lorca)
 Asses (Plautus)
 The Servant of Two Masters (Goldoni)
 An Evening of Sketches by Anton Chekhov
 Woyzeck by Büchner
 The Cherry Orchard by Anton Chekhov
 Ghosts by Henrik Ibsen
 Suitcase Packers by Hanoch Levin, premiered at the Cameri Theatre, 1983
  Demons and Dybbuks, an adaptation of stories by Isaac Bashevis Singer at the Cameri Theatre, 2001

Bibliography (selection) 
A Shared experience: The actor as story-teller Series: Theatre papers. Published 1980 by Dartington College of Arts
The Wandering Jew by Michelene Wandor, Mike Alfreds. Published 27 May 1988 by Heinemann Educational Books 
Different Every Night: Freeing the Actor, Published 1 April 2008 by Nick Hern Books 
Then What Happens? Storytelling & Adapting for Theater. Published 2013 by Nick Hern Books,   Published 21 August 2014 by Nick Hern Books,
The Surprise of Love by Pierre Carlet De Marivaux, translated by Mike Alfreds. Published 2011 by Oberon Books,

External links 
 Bibliography at doollee.com

Article in the Independent, 29 May 1996 David Benedict - Alfreds' way: more method, less madness 
The play is not the thing- actors and storytelling in theatre, at the site of Editions Nick Hern Books 
Video interview with Mike Alfred on directing The Tin Ring adapted by Jane Arnold on memories of holocaust survivor Zdenka Fantlová
 Top theatre director Mike Alfreds coming to Bolton (B. Little Theatre) to share expertise with town's actors (09-April-2015) 
Scene of Pedro, the Great Pretender, production by the Royal Shakespeare Company, directed by M. Alfreds in 2004

English theatre directors
English artistic directors
English dramatists and playwrights
Critics' Circle Theatre Award winners
Living people
1934 births
Theatre people from London
Jewish theatre directors